The Zagreb Stock Exchange or ZSE is a stock exchange located in Zagreb, Croatia. It is Croatia's only stock exchange. The exchange trades shares of Croatian companies, as well as bonds and commercial bills.

The ZSE was established in 1991 as the successor of "Zagreb Stock Exchange for the goods and values" which was co-founded by Samuel David Alexander in 1907. In March 2007 it incorporated VSE, forming a single Croatian capital market, leading in the region by market capitalization and trading volume. As of 31 December 2016, ZSE's total market capitalization was 232.4 billion kn (€30.8 billion).

The exchange has pre-market sessions from 09:00 to 10:00 and normal trading sessions from 10:00 to 16:00 on all days of the week except Saturdays, Sundays and holidays declared by the exchange in advance.

The Zagreb Stock Exchange is located in the skyscraper Eurotower at the intersection of Vukovarska and Lučićeva street.

The Zagreb Stock Exchange is a member of the Federation of Euro-Asian Stock Exchanges.

The Zagreb Stock Exchange publishes the following indices:
 CROBEX, stocks
 CROBIS, bonds

CROBIS
CROBIS is the official Zagreb Stock Exchange bond index. The index  tracks ten bulleted bonds with fixed interest rates, each worth a minimum nominal value of €75 million and with a maturity rate of at least 18 months. Revisions to the index are carried out four times a year.

References

External links
 
CROBIS at the Zagreb Stock Exchange site
CROBIS chart at Rast.hr

Stock exchanges in Europe
Financial services in Zagreb
Companies based in Zagreb
Financial services companies established in 1991
Business organizations based in Croatia
Croatian companies established in 1991